Danilo I Petrović-Njegoš (1670 – 11 January 1735) was the Metropolitan of Cetinje between 1697 and 1735, and the founder of the House of Petrović-Njegoš, which ruled Montenegro from 1697 to 1918.

He was also known by the patronymic Danilo Šćepčević.

Early life and background
Danilo Šćepčević was born in Njeguši, the son of Stepan or Šćepan Kaluđerović, a merchant, and Ana, who later became a nun. He had a brother, Radul, known as Rade Šćepčev. His paternal family belonged to the Heraković brotherhood.

As a fifteen-year-old, he was a witness to the battle of Vrtijeljka (1685). It is possible that he heard the details of the battle from some survivor. He mentioned "noble and famous hajduks who fell at Vrtijeljka" in a letter to the Montenegrin chiefs dated to 1714.

After the death of Sava Očinić, the Metropolitan of Cetinje, in 1697, there was turmoil surrounding the election of a new metropolitan.

Chirotony
In 1697, the Montenegrin tribal assembly chose Danilo Šćepčević as the head of the Serbian Orthodox Metropolitanate of Cetinje, following the Great Migrations of the Serbs which left the seat of the Serbian Church to Phanariote Greeks who were closely associated with the Porte. Danilo was, as other Serbian bishops, unwilling to subordinate himself to Kalinik I, the new Patriarch of Peć.

In 1700, he chose not attend an assembly dedicated to Kalinik in Peć, but instead went to Dunaszekcső (Sečuj), in Habsburg Hungary, at the assembly of the Serbian Patriarch in exile, Arsenije III. Danilo was chirotonized by Arsenije III as the bishop of Cetinje and Metropolitan of Skenderija and Primorje. The chirotony, which took place during the national-church assembly, was participated by Serbian metropolitans from all over the Serbian lands, as well as other notable Serbs.  It is likely that Danilo had met Arsenije III earlier when Arsenije was in Cetinje in 1689, asking the Montenegrins to take up arms and unite, to organize a fight against the Ottomans.

Tenure
He coordinated defense operations and partially settled tribal disputes among his people.

An uprising broke out in 1711, after calls by Danilo, where the Montenegrins fought alongside Highlanders and Herzegovinians against local Ottomans.

During his rule political ties between Russia and Montenegro were first established. Russian historian Pavel Rovinsky, in writing about Montenegrin-Russian relations, concluded that it was the pretensions of Turkey and Austria (and at times the Republic of Venice) that turned Montenegro to Russia. Having nowhere to turn in the terrible struggle for the survival of their people, the leading spirits of the Serb land of Montenegro turned to the past, to their mythical origins—to the ancient homeland of the Slavs—all the more readily because it was not only a Great Power but an increasingly powerful factor as a counter-Turkish and counter-Austrian force.

Danilo had this message for the Montenegrin common council (zbor) and its tribal chiefs in 1714:

In 1715, Danilo visited Czar Peter I at St. Petersburg and secured his alliance against the Ottomans—a journey that became traditional among his successors in Montenegro and in all the Serbian lands elsewhere in the Balkans. He subsequently recovered Zeta from the Ottomans, restored the monastery at Cetinje, and erected defences around Podostrog-Podmaine Monastery in Budva, which was rebuilt in 1630 and served as a summer residence of the ruling family of Montenegro.

On 1 May 1718 the Republic of Venice recognized Danilo as the spiritual authority over the Orthodox in Paštrovići and the Bay of Kotor. From then on, until the fall of Venice, the Metropolitans of Cetinje had the right to build new and reconstruct destroyed churches in those territories, and to freely preach there.

Succession

Danilo was succeeded by two close kinsmen, first his cousin Sava II Petrović Njegoš and then his nephew Vasilije Petrović Njegoš, who for more than two decades was able to push aside the unworldly Sava and become effectively the highest authority in Montenegro and its representative abroad. Danilo's choice of Sava II clearly had a lot to do with family ties and clan membership, Sava's family came from the Petrovići's native Njeguši. Like Danilo, Sava became a monk, serving in the Maine monastery on the coast where he was consecrated as an archpriest in 1719 by the Serbian Patriarch of Peć, Mojsije (1712–1726). From the time of his ordination onwards, Danilo sought to introduce the young Sava gradually to political life, conferring on him the office of coadjutor in confirmation of his future role. But little about Sava's later career suggests that he gained much from early exposure to Danilo's experience, except that he continued to maintain a policy of status quo while allowing the tribal chieftains a free hand to do as they pleased.

Politics
Danilo was instrumental in the process of connecting families, clans and tribes.

He was said to have issued the "extermination of the Turkicized" (Istraga poturica), as included in The Mountain Wreath (1847), however, there are views that this never happened.

Styles
"Danil, Metropolitan of Skenderija and Primorje" (Данил, митрополит Скендерије u Приморја), 1715.
"Danil, Bishop of Cetinje, Njegoš, Duke of the Serb land" (Данил, владика цетињски, Његош, војеводич српској земљи), 1732.

Annotations

See also
 Danilo I, Prince of Montenegro

References

Sources

External links

 

1670 births
1735 deaths
17th-century Eastern Orthodox bishops
18th-century Eastern Orthodox bishops
Clergy from Cetinje
Serbs of Montenegro
Vladika Danilo
Petrović-Njegoš dynasty
Prince-bishops of Montenegro
Bishops of the Serbian Orthodox Church